Huwag Kang Mangamba (International title: Mysterious Destiny / ) is a 2021 Philippine drama television series broadcast by Kapamilya Channel. Directed by Emmanuel Palo, Darnel Joy Villaflor, Jerry Lopez Sineneng and Ram Tolentino, it stars an ensemble cast headed by Andrea Brillantes, Francine Diaz, Kyle Echarri and Seth Fedelin. The series premiered on Kapamilya Channel's Primetime Bida evening block, A2Z, and TV5, and worldwide via TFC from March 22, 2021, to November 12, 2021, on Monday to Friday (with the exclusion on Easter Triduum of Holy Week days: Maundy Thursday and Good Friday) at 8:45 PM (PST), replacing Ang sa Iyo ay Akin and was replaced by Viral Scandal.

Plot summary
The story is set in the resort town of Hermoso, in the province of Laguna in the southern region of Luzon, Philippines. A tourist favorite because of its pristine beaches, healing hot springs, spas and resorts, Hermoso was once also a center of religious devotion, attracting thousands of visitors from all over the country drawn to its spas' healing powers and religious conversions. In those times, the townspeople were devoted to their faith. But on one night, a fire burns down the only church in the town, its parish priest killed over a golden crown encrusted with jewels and the church is never rebuilt. Eventually, the townspeople preoccupy themselves with the material prosperity of their tourist town and lose their devotion to God. One priest, Father Sebastian, serves a remnant of the church's devotees.

Fatima Cruz is a member of Dakilang Sinag, a rebel group in the jungles outside Hermoso, who is targeted by the military led by Samuel Cordero. The two are thrown together and fall in love.

Fatima leaves her life with the rebels to marry Samuel and they have a daughter named Joy. Abel, the rebel leader and Fatima's childhood friend, tries to convince her to return, but their meeting is misunderstood by Samuel, who believes Fatima used him solely for the group's purpose. Samuel and Fatima's marriage breaks down when Samuel is involved in a drunken affair with Agatha, a flight stewardess and his ex-girlfriend. The affair produces another daughter for Samuel, whom they name Sofia. Delighted, Agatha breaks her pregnancy news to Fatima. Devastated by her husband's betrayal, Fatima tells Samuel she is leaving him. Convinced that Fatima is returning to her rebel life, he retrieves Joy as Fatima and her friend Esther are kidnapped by Abel. At the camp, Fatima discovers she is pregnant. After rape and torture by Abel, Fatima escapes and delivers Mira, in the mountains of Laguna.

Meanwhile, Samuel moves into a common law relationship with Agatha, convinced that Fatima left him. Joy grows up with her step-mother and half-sister Sofia. Since Samuel is often away on military missions, the family moves in with Agatha's sister Deborah who claims to have healing powers. Agatha abuses Joy, who also suffers the cruelty of her troubled half-sister, Sofia.

In the mountains outside Hermoso, Fatima, who now goes by her maiden name, Faith Cruz, raises her second child Mira who is born blind. When she hears of Samuel's whereabouts, she leaves 7-year old Mira at an orphanage to find Samuel and tell him about what truly happened.  But when she sees Samuel with his new family, she decides to retrieve Joy and encounters her death at the hands of Agatha and Deborah. Fatima never returns and Mira grows up in the orphanage and ten years later heads for Hermoso to look for her mother. She arrives at the resort town with nothing except her faith in Bro. That night, Mira is fatally hit by a car and the only witness is the town's Mendicant, Barang. A miracle occurs when Mira comes back to life. At the same time in another part of the town, after a violent fight with her sister Sofia, Joy drives off and crashes onto a light post. Joy is pronounced dead on arrival at the hospital while Deborah prays over her. At that moment, Joy comes back to life as well. The delusional Deborah takes the opportunity to claim this miracle as her own doing.

The lives of Mira and Joy intertwine when they share the same miraculous experience. Unaware that they are siblings, Joy initially rejects Mira, but as time goes by, finds a renewed faith through her mother's diary and Mira's persistence. At this time, the statue of Jesus Christ, whom they call "Bro", comes to life and speaks to them about their mission to rebuild the church and restore the townspeople's faith in God.

Mira and Joy join up with Father Seb, and together with a handful of people plan to restore the burnt down church in Hermoso. Against all odds and a godless community, Mira and Joy follow "Bro", inspiring the townspeople of Hermoso to find their way back to their faith.

Meanwhile, taking advantage of the town's superstitious residents, and anticipating a lucrative source of income, Deborah claims the miracles are attributable to her healing powers, including Mira's restored sight. Mira steadfastly gives the glory to "Bro" as the healer, further agitating Deborah who by this time, has a growing fanatical flock worshiping "Santa Deborah."

A powerful political family perpetuates the myth of Deborah's healings. Simon Advincula uses her crowd draw to support his grandson Miguel's mayoral election campaign. He helps Deborah discredit Mira and Joy through his troll farms. Miguel builds a healing dome for Deborah establishing her church where she can draw financial support from her believers. Deborah and Miguel partner up and use the church as a front for illegal activities such as drugs and arms smuggling. As many more miracles surrounding Joy and Mira occur, Deborah claims credit for all these as Mira and Joy insist that the miracles are all from "Bro". This infuriates Deborah, particularly more so when the girls’ campaign to rebuild the town church conflicts with her healing dome.

Mira and Joy face many trials together as they deal with diverse people with different morals, beliefs and values. They tell the townspeople that "Bro" speaks with them, and exhorts them to restore their faith in God.

When the girls discover they are siblings, they investigate their mother's disappearance together. With the help of investigative reporter, Miss Eva, and a handful of town folks who believe in them, they discover Barang is their grandmother and Fatima's mother. They also learn of their mother's fate. Devastated over their mother's violent death, Barang and the siblings face several more challenges. As they attempt to bring justice for their mother, they struggle with the evil that controls the town, winning hearts for “Bro”in the process.

While the many characters in the story slowly turn to "Bro" the town's transformation from Godless to faithful unfolds into a beautiful story of faith, forgiveness and redemption.

Cast

Main cast
 Andrea Brillantes as Mira Cruz / Mira C. Cordero
 Francine Diaz as Joy C. Cordero
 Kyle Echarri as Rafael "Rafa" Advincula
 Seth Fedelin as Pio Estopacio

Supporting cast 
 Eula Valdez as Deborah Delos Santos (Deborah Sun)
Mica Javier as young Deborah
 Sylvia Sanchez as Virginia "Barang" Angeles
Gillian Vicencio as young Barang
 Nonie Buencamino as Simon Advincula
 Mylene Dizon as Eva Marquez
 Diether Ocampo as Samuel Cordero
 RK Bagatsing as Miguel Advincula
 Enchong Dee as Sebastian "Seb" Tantiangco
 Angeline Quinto as Darling Sanchez
 Mercedes Cabral as Agatha Delos Santos
 Dominic Ochoa as Tomas Estopacio
 Soliman Cruz as Carlito "Caloy" Sanchez
 Matet de Leon as Rebecca Estopacio

Recurring cast 
 Alyanna Angeles as Sofia D. Cordero
 Paolo Gumabao as Maximo Delos Santos
 Renz Aguilar as Zacharias "Carrie" Baltazar
 Renshi de Guzman as Hans R. Alvarez
 Margaux Montana as Babygirl "Ghie" Andrade
 Raven Rigor as Mateo Panganiban
 Matty Juniosa as Roberto "Bobby" Magbanua

Minor cast
 Allan Paule as Fidel Alvarez
 Anne Feo as Diana Rodriguez-Alvarez
 Mark Dionisio as Abel Claverio
 Tess Antonio as Esther Calalang
 Micah Muñoz as Dante Ruiz
 Nieves Manaban as Norma Delos Santos
 Sherry Lara as Luzviminda Cruz
 Joshua Colet as Julius
 Rafael Rosell as Diego Romulo
 Luke Alford as Joaquin Romulo
 Art Acuña as Oscar Tantiangco
 Jane Oineza as Rose Aguilar / Emily Abuel
 Arlene Muhlach as Edna Baltazar
 Marvin Yap as Aldo Baltazar
 Jim Bergado as Bruno Baltazar
 Andrea del Rosario as Thelma Policarpio
 Richard Quan as Armand Policarpio
 Nash Aguas as Apollo Salvacion
 Vivoree Esclito as Freya Salvador
 Andi Abaya as Micaella "Mikay" Villaluna

Guest cast
 Dimples Romana as Fatima "Faith" Cruz-Cordero / Lucia Angeles
 Christopher De Leon as Elias Arcilla

Production
Filming for the drama started on December 4, 2020, with a lock-in taping set-up.

Holy Week re-run
Huwag Kang Mangamba re-run its episodes on Good Friday, April 2, 2021, at 6:00 pm on Kapamilya Channel and Kapamilya Online Live. A2Z re-run its episodes on Black Saturday, April 3, 2021, at 2:00 pm. The teleserye will dubbed as Huwag Kang Mangamba: The Holy Week Special.

Casting
Ian Veneracion was originally cast to play the role of Elias, but he backed out of this show because of scheduling conflicts for the upcoming new season. Christopher De Leon took over the role as Elias.

Accolades

See also
List of programs broadcast by Kapamilya Channel
List of programs broadcast by Kapamilya Online Live
List of programs broadcast by Jeepney TV
List of programs broadcast by A2Z (Philippine TV channel)
List of programs broadcast by TV5 (Philippine TV network)
List of ABS-CBN drama series

References

External links

ABS-CBN drama series
Fiction about God
Portrayals of Jesus on television
Murder in television
Philippine crime television series
Philippine drama television series
Philippine fantasy television series
Philippine thriller television series
2021 Philippine television series debuts
2021 Philippine television series endings
Television series by Dreamscape Entertainment Television
Filipino-language television shows
Television shows set in the Philippines
Television shows about Catholicism